Huang Jiajun (born 19 August 1995) is a Chinese professional footballer who plays as a defender for Shijiazhuang Gongfu.

Club career
Huang Jiajun would go abroad to Portugal to further his football development and would join third-tier club SG Sacavenense where he would make his senior debut in a league game on 12 October 2014 against Sintrense in a 2-1 defeat. After a loan move to another Portuguese team in Pinhalnovense, Huang would return to China when he joined top tier club Jiangsu Suning on 24 February 2017.

Career statistics

.

References

External links

1995 births
Living people
Chinese footballers
Association football defenders
Campeonato de Portugal (league) players
Chinese Super League players
Clube Oriental de Lisboa players
C.D. Pinhalnovense players
Jiangsu F.C. players
Footballers from Guangdong
Sportspeople from Shenzhen
Chinese expatriate footballers
Chinese expatriate sportspeople in Portugal
Expatriate footballers in Portugal